David Code (born 6 April 1957) is a former Australian rules footballer who played for Melbourne in the Victorian Football League (VFL).

An Old Haileyburian, Code spent just one season at Melbourne. He later played with Devonport in the TFL Statewide League and won the 1987 William Leitch Medal and was a member of their premiership team the following season. He is also a dual Morrison Medalist with Shepparton Football Club in the Goulburn Valley Football Netball League

References

Holmesby, Russell and Main, Jim (2007). The Encyclopedia of AFL Footballers. 7th ed. Melbourne: Bas Publishing.

1957 births
Living people
Melbourne Football Club players
Devonport Football Club players
William Leitch Medal winners
Shepparton Football Club players
Old Haileyburians Amateur Football Club players
Australian rules footballers from Victoria (Australia)